The National Highway 105 or the N-105 is one of Pakistan National Highway running from Larkana to the town of Lakhi via Naudero in Sindh province of Pakistan. Its total length is 61 km, the highway is maintained and operated by Pakistan's National Highway Authority.

See also

References

External links
 National Highway Authority

Roads in Pakistan